Serena and Venus Williams defeated Virginia Ruano Pascual and Paola Suárez in the final, 4–6, 6–4, 6–3 to win the women's doubles tennis title at the 2003 Australian Open. It was their second Australian Open title together and sixth major title together overall.

Martina Hingis and Anna Kournikova were the reigning champions, but Hingis did not participate. Kournikova partnered Chanda Rubin, but lost in the third round to Conchita Martínez and Nadia Petrova.

Seeds

Draw

Finals

Top half

Section 1

Section 2

Bottom half

Section 3

Section 4

External links
 2003 Australian Open – Women's draws and results at the International Tennis Federation
 Official Results Archive (Australian Open)
 Official Results Archive (WTA)

Women's Doubles
Australian Open (tennis) by year – Women's doubles
2003 in Australian women's sport